Shiv Pratap Singh was an Indian politician and former BJP State President of Chhattisgarh. He was Member of Rajya Sabha representing Chhattisgarh and also Minister of State in Undivided Madhya Pradesh.

References 

 http://www.thaindian.com/newsportal/politics/bjp-congress-bag-a-rajya-sabha-seat-each-in-chhattisgarh_10032208.html 

2014 deaths
Chhattisgarh politicians
Rajya Sabha members from Chhattisgarh
Members of Parliament from Chhattisgarh
Bharatiya Janata Party politicians from Chhattisgarh
1942 births